Tommy Murphy (8 November 1903 – 25 May 1958) was an  Australian rules footballer who played with South Melbourne in the Victorian Football League (VFL).

Notes

External links 

1903 births
1958 deaths
Australian rules footballers from Victoria (Australia)
Sydney Swans players